John Murray Rose  (14 December 1939 – 5 August 2021) was a New Zealand politician of the National Party.

Biography

Rose was born in Dunedin in 1939. He received his education at Waitahuna Primary and John McGlashan College. He held roles with Federated Farmers, the Presbyterian Church, Lions Clubs International, and the Lawrence Club.

Rose married Christine Mary Fulton, the daughter of Bruce I. Fulton, on 22 October 1966. They had five daughters.

He was one of four National Party incumbents from Otago and Southland who lost their normally blue electorate to the Labour challenger over the proposed raising of the lake levels of lakes Manapouri and Te Anau, which was opposed by the Save Manapouri campaign. Labour's election manifesto was for the lakes to remain at their natural levels.

In the 1994 Queen's Birthday Honours, Rose was awarded the Queen's Service Medal for public services. In 1999, he was diagnosed with Parkinson's disease. He published his autobiography, More Than Meets the Eye, in 2010, with a reviewer commenting that the "political material is particularly interesting". Rose died in Dunedin on 5 August 2021.

Bibliography

References

1939 births
2021 deaths
New Zealand National Party MPs
Politicians from Dunedin
New Zealand MPs for South Island electorates
Recipients of the Queen's Service Medal
Unsuccessful candidates in the 1972 New Zealand general election
People educated at John McGlashan College
Members of the New Zealand House of Representatives
People with Parkinson's disease